The Pennsylvania State Association was a class D level league of minor league baseball that existed from 1934 until 1942. The league franchised were entirely based in  Western Pennsylvania.

History
The Pennsylvania State Association was composed mostly of major league affiliate teams. During the nine-year run of the league there were eleven cities, all from Pennsylvania, that represented the league. Elmer M. Daily served as president of the league the full nine years of its existence. The Butler Yankees won five of the league's nine championships, winning back-to-back titles in 1937 and 1938 and winning the final three titles for the league in 1940, 1941 and 1942. There were at least sixteen known players from the league who managed to make it to the majors. Also, in the league, there were some twenty-one team managers who had been affiliated with a major league team, during their baseball careers.
The Pennsylvania State Association did not restart after World War II and it has been dormant since that time.

Cities represented

Beaver Falls, PA:  Beaver Falls Bees 1937; Beaver Falls Browns 1938; Beaver Falls Bees 1939; Beaver Falls Browns 1940; Beaver Falls Bees 1941
Butler, PA:  Butler Indians 1935; Butler Yankees 1936–1942
Charleroi, PA:  Charleroi Tigers 1934–1936
Greensburg, PA:  Greensburg Trojans 1934; Greensburg Red Wings 1935–1936; Greensburg Green Sox 1937–1938; Greensburg Senators 1939
Jeannette, PA:  Jeannette Reds 1934; Jeannette Little Pirates 1936; Jeannette Bisons 1937
Johnstown, PA:  Johnstown Johnnies 1939–1942
McKeesport, PA:  McKeesport Tubers 1934; McKeesport Braves 1935; McKeesport Tubers 1936–1937; McKeesport Tubers 1938; McKeesport Little Pirates 1939; McKeesport Little Braves 1940
Monessen, PA:  Monessen Indians 1934; Monessen Reds 1935; Monessen Indians 1936; Monessen Cardinals 1937
Oil City, PA: Oil City Oilers 1940–1942
Warren, PA:  Warren Redskins 1940; Warren Buckeyes 1941
Washington, PA:  Washington Generals 1934–1935; Washington Red Birds 1939–1942

League champions
1934 - Greensburg Trojans
1935 - Monessen Reds
1936 - Jeannette Little Pirates
1937 - Butler Yankees
1938 - Butler Yankees - 2
1939 - Washington Red Birds
1940 - Butler Yankees - 3
1941 - Butler Yankees - 4
1942 - Butler Yankees - 5

Baseball leagues in Pennsylvania
Defunct minor baseball leagues in the United States
Sports leagues established in 1934
Sports leagues disestablished in 1942